Maria Hagemeyer was the first woman to become a judge in Germany. In 1924 she was appointed as an Assessor in Prussia, and in 1927 she was appointed as a judge for the district court of Bonn. She was promoted to a lifelong position in 1928. However, the Nazis dismissed all judges in 1933.

See also
 List of first women lawyers and judges by nationality

References

German women judges
20th-century German judges
20th-century women judges